Where in the World Is Osama bin Laden? is a 2008 documentary film, conceived by Adam Dell and co-written, produced, directed by, and starring Morgan Spurlock, an American independent filmmaker.

The title of the film is a play on the title of the television game show and computer game series, Where in the World Is Carmen Sandiego?, and other “Where in the World is” themes.

The CIA revealed that Osama bin Laden himself had a copy of the film at his hideout in Abbottabad, Pakistan.

Synopsis
After some comical animations involving Al-Qaeda leader Osama bin Laden, the film shows Spurlock visiting various countries associated with or affected by bin Laden. The film contains short interviews with many people about Bin Laden and Islamic fundamentalism, and about the United States and its war on terror. Supposedly, Spurlock searches for bin Laden, and he even asks people at random in the street where he is.

The film is intercut with images of Spurlock's wife in the late stages of her pregnancy. Much of Spurlock's commentary is based on the concerns of a new father.

Spurlock visits Morocco, Egypt, Saudi Arabia, Jordan, Israel, Afghanistan, and Pakistan. In Afghanistan, guarded by about 21 Afghan Army soldiers, he visits Tora Bora. A local government official is shown who wants to change it into an amusement park. Spurlock is also shown on a US Army patrol as an embedded journalist.

Spurlock is shown hesitating to enter the area of Pakistan near the Afghan border where bin Laden is at the time, which is closed to foreigners, and deciding not to go there, arguing that it is not worth the risk.  He concludes that the people in the countries he visited are ordinary people just like himself and the audience.

Spurlock guesses that bin Laden is likely hiding in Abbottabad, Pakistan, where he was found three years later.

Reception
Where in the World Is Osama bin Laden? received a mixed reception from critics. On Rotten Tomatoes, the film holds an approval score of 38% based on 108 reviews, with an average rating of 4.90/10. The consensus reads, "Morgan Sprulock's  doc offers occasional insights but gets bogged down by the director/subject's gimmicky schtick." On Metacritic, the film has a score of 45 out of 100 based on 28 critics' reviews, indicating "mixed or average reviews".

See also
 List of cultural references of the September 11 attacks
 Being Osama

References

External links

 Where in the World is Osama Bin Laden?  at sundance.org

2008 documentary films
American documentary films
Documentary films about terrorism
Films shot in Egypt
Films directed by Morgan Spurlock
Works about Osama bin Laden
Documentary films about Egypt
Documentary films about the War in Afghanistan (2001–2021)
2000s English-language films
2000s American films